East Molesey Cricket Club is a cricket club in Molesey, Surrey. It was established in 1871, although cricket has been played at the Moulsey Hurst since 1731. East Molesey's current ground, 'The Memorial Ground', has been the home for the Surrey club since the late 19th century and is situated just outside the town centre, sitting right on the bank of the River Thames. They currently compete in the Surrey Championship, the Club Cricket Conference Cup, the Bertie Joel Cup and the Thameside Sunday League.

History
In 1795, the first ever recorded LBW decision was made at Moulsey Hurst, 500 metres from the site of the current ground.

In the 1950s, East Molesey played host to both the Australian cricket team and the New Zealand cricket team in warm up matches during their respective tours of England. More recently, in 2003 the club organised a game with Lashings, in which many former test players took part, including Mark Waugh, Richie Richardson and Chris Harris. In 2011, a fantastic flurry of victories that culminated in a promotion-winning six hit by Henry Glynn meant that East Molesey were promoted back into the ECB Premier Division for the 2012 season.

They reclaimed the Surrey Championship title for the second time in 2019, 39 years after their first triumph.

Honours
Surrey Championship champions - 1980
Surrey Championship champions - 2019
Surrey Championship champions - 2021

References

External links 
 Surrey Championship

English club cricket teams
Cricket in Surrey
1871 establishments in England
Cricket clubs established in 1871